Darya Saltykova may refer to:

 Darya Nikolayevna Saltykova (1730–1801), Russian serial killer
 Darya Petrovna Saltykova (1739–1802), Russian lady-in-waiting and socialite